Hans Gustav Alfred Breidbach-Bernau (16 March 1921 – 15 May 2014) was an Austrian writer. He competed in the "epic works" category of the art competitions at the 1948 Summer Olympics, but did not win a medal. He was born in Vienna and worked in photojournalism during World War II. Following the conflict he took up freelance writing in addition to roles as an athletics coach and sports publicist. He died in Bad Ischl on 15 May 2014.

References

External links

1921 births
2014 deaths
Austrian male writers
Olympic competitors in art competitions
20th-century Austrian writers
Writers from Vienna